Bucculatrix humiliella is a moth of the family Bucculatricidae. It is found from Fennoscandia to the Pyrenees and the Alps and from Great Britain to Poland. It was described by Gottlieb August Wilhelm Herrich-Schäffer in 1855.

The wingspan is 8–9 mm.

The larvae feed on yarrow (Achillea millefolium) and tansy (Tanacetum vulgare). They mine the leaves of their host plant. Young larvae mine out a fine leaf segment completely, leaving a black, central frass line. Older larvae live free on the upper side of the leaf, causing window feeding.

External links
 
 Plant Parasites of Europe

Bucculatricidae
Leaf miners
Moths described in 1855
Moths of Europe
Taxa named by Gottlieb August Wilhelm Herrich-Schäffer